The Rough Guide to English Roots Music is a world music compilation album originally released in 1998. Part of the World Music Network Rough Guides series, the album features mainly English folk, with some tracks covering other cultures from England's ethnic range. Most pieces are from the 1990s. Phil Stanton, co-founder of the World Music Network, was the producer.

Critical reception

The album received generally positive reviews. Writing for AllMusic, Steven McDonald praised the track choices, saying it functions well as an "appetizer". BBC Music Magazine noted that instead of focusing on the preservers of tradition, the album featured "creators and extenders".

Track listing

References 

1998 compilation albums
World Music Network Rough Guide albums